Idrigill is a small crofting village, on the coast of Uig Bay, on the west side of the Trotternish Peninsula, near Uig, in Portree, Isle of Skye, Scottish Highlands and is in the Scottish council area of Highland.

References

Populated places in the Isle of Skye